Matthew Clark (born 4 April 1968) is an English darts player who competes for the Professional Darts Corporation (PDC) and formerly played for the British Darts Organisation (BDO). He uses the nickname "Superman" for his matches.

Darting history
Matt Clark first started playing darts at the age of 19 at his local village pub, and after a few years was playing for the Kent county team. At the age of 24 he began moving towards pro darts attending the Dutch Open where he made the quarter finals of the pairs and singles competitions. Clark appeared in the BDO World Darts Championship eight successive years, reaching the quarter-finals in 1996.

He switched to the PDC in 2004 and quickly reached the top 32 in the world rankings. He made his PDC World Darts Championship debut in 2006 and reached the second round, losing to eventual champion Phil Taylor. He entered the 2007 tournament as the number 31 seed, but lost in the first round to Mick McGowan. In 2008, Clark lost in the first round to Roland Scholten. Despite losing, Clark won more legs than Scholten, Clark winning 12 to Scholten's 10. However, he gained revenge on Scholten having qualified for the 2008 World Matchplay through the Players Championship Order of Merit and defeating him 10–4 in the first round. He continued to defeat veteran Peter Manley 13–6 in an upset and reached the quarter-finals, his best performance in the competition, before being defeated by defending champion James Wade, despite checking out at 161 which was the highest checkout of that year's tournament. Prior to the Matchplay Event Matt lost 3 stone in weight which forced him to change his throwing stance.

Clark suffered a first round exit in the 2009 PDC World Darts Championship, losing to Kevin Painter in a sudden leg death which Clark missed one dart at double 12 to win.

After losing his PDC Tour Card at the end of 2017, Clark decided to play the some of the BDO Tour and the PDC Challenge Tour. A final in the Luxembourg Open and a quarter-final in the Belfry Open were followed by an agonising loss in the BDO World Championship qualifiers when he was one win from qualifying. Clark also made a quarter-final on the Challenge Tour in 2018 before re-entering PDC UK Q-School in January 2019. A last 16 exit on day two put him in a good position to win back his Tour Card, and he did it by right on the third day, beating Gavin Carlin 5–2 in the final to seal a two-year PDC Tour Card. Matt Clark also took part in the PDC Home Tour, on Saturday 25 April 2020, missing out on winning his group by one leg. The other three players in his group consisted of Harry Ward, Martijn Kleermaker and Michael Smith.

World Championship results

BDO
 1996: Quarter Final (lost to Les Wallace 1–4)
 1997: 1st Round (lost to Andy Fordham 2–3)
 1998: 1st Round (lost to Mervyn King 0–3)
 1999: 1st Round (lost to Paul Williams 2–3)
 2000: 2nd Round (lost to Chris Mason 2–3)
 2001: 2nd Round (lost to Kevin Painter 1–3)
 2002: 1st Round (lost to Marko Pusa 1–3)
 2003: 1st Round (lost to Raymond van Barneveld 1–3)

PDC
 2006: 2nd Round (lost to Phil Taylor 1–4)
 2007: 1st Round (lost to Mick McGowan 1–3)
 2008: 1st Round (lost to Roland Scholten 2–3)
 2009: 1st Round (lost to Kevin Painter 2–3) 
 2010: 1st Round (lost to Mervyn King 0–3)
 2014: 1st Round (lost to Vincent van der Voort 1–3)

Career statistics

(W) Won; (F) finalist; (SF) semifinalist; (QF) quarterfinalist; (#R) rounds 6, 5, 4, 3, 2, 1; (RR) round-robin stage; (Prel.) Preliminary round; (DNQ) Did not qualify; (DNP) Did not participate; (NH) Not held

Performance timeline

References

External links
 Matt Clark's official website
 

1968 births
English darts players
Living people
British Darts Organisation players
Professional Darts Corporation former tour card holders